Shivendra Singh Patel is an Indian politician belonging to the Bharatiya Janata Party. He was the mayor of Rewa, Madhya Pradesh. He held the post of Rewa's Nagar president one time and two times Rewa's Nagar vice president.

References

Bharatiya Janata Party politicians from Madhya Pradesh
Living people
Year of birth missing (living people)
People from Rewa, Madhya Pradesh
Mayors of places in Madhya Pradesh